Alexander McPhee Miller (born 27 December 1936) is an Australian novelist. Miller is twice winner of the Miles Franklin Award, in 1993 for The Ancestor Game and in 2003 for Journey to the Stone Country. He won the overall award for the Commonwealth Writer's Prize for The Ancestor Game in 1993.  He is twice winner of the New South Wales Premier's Literary Awards Christina Stead Prize for Conditions of Faith in 2001 and for Lovesong in 2011.  In recognition of his impressive body of work and in particular for his novel Autumn Laing he was awarded the Melbourne Prize for Literature in 2012.

Life
Alex Miller was born in London to a Scottish father and Irish mother. After working as a farm labourer in Somerset he migrated alone to Australia at the age of 16. He worked as a ringer in Queensland and as a horse breaker in New Zealand before studying at night school to gain university entrance. Miller graduated from the University of Melbourne in English and History in 1965. In 1975 he published his first short story, 'Comrade Pawel' in Meanjin Quarterly. In 1980 he was a co-founder of the Anthill Theatre and a founding member of the Melbourne Writers' Theatre. Miller taught writing courses at Holmesglen TAFE and La Trobe University between 1986 and 1997. Miller has written full-time since 1998.  In this time he has written nine of his thirteen published novels and his non-fiction, Max. His work has received wide critical acclaim.

Alex Miller lives in country Victoria with his wife Stephanie.  The Ancestor Game was re-published by Allen & Unwin in 2016 as a celebratory edition to mark 25 years since its publication and to honour the author on his 80th birthday.

Writing
Miller's first novel, Watching the Climbers on the Mountain, was published in 1988 and republished by Allen & Unwin in 2012. Major national and international recognition came with the publication of The Ancestor Game, his third novel and the winner of both the Miles Franklin Award and overall winner of the Commonwealth Writers' Prize in 1993. Since then Miller has published on average a major novel every two years, his tenth being Autumn Laing published in 2011. The Melbourne critic Peter Craven, writing in The Australian on 14 July 2012, describes Autumn Laing as "superb" and says of it, "it is the novel that is liable to burn brightest in the whole of his oeuvre." Professor Brenda Walker suggests that 'Alex Miller may be Australia's greatest living writer'.

Robert Dixon, Professor of Australian Literature at Sydney University writes that Miller's 'novels are by and large accessible to the general reading public yet manifestly of high literary seriousness - substantial, technically masterly and assured, intricately interconnected, and of great imaginative, intellectual and ethical weight'. The Novels of Alex Miller, edited and with an introduction by Robert Dixon was published in 2012 following a two-day Symposium at the University of Sydney in 2011 as a major critical study devoted to Miller’s works. In 2014 Robert Dixon published the first sole-authored critical survey of the respected author's eleven novels.  Robert Dixon's Alex Miller:  the ruin of time is the first of the Sydney Studies in Australian Literature series 

Miller's novel Autumn Laing was inspired by his lifelong interest in art and is loosely based on the relationship between Sidney Nolan and Sunday Reed.

Coal Creek, published in 2013 by Allen & Unwin won the 2014 Victorian Premier's Literary Award.

In 2015 Alex Miller published a collection of short stories and essays drawn from forty years of writing, The Simplest Words A Storyteller's Journey.  Peter Pierce describes this collection as 'a rich, generous compilation that enticingly refracts our perceptions of one of Australia's finest novelists'.

The Passage of Love, published by Allen & Unwin in 2017,  was described by Michael Cathcart, when interviewing Alex Miller on ABC Radio, as 'The most candid, sharing, generous book I've read in a long, long time.'

Max is a work of non-fiction which tells of Alex Miller's friendship with his mentor, Max Blatt, and his search to understand Max's life.  The book was published by Allen & Unwin in 2020. Writing in The Age/Sydney Morning Herald, Michael McGirr says ' Max is haunted by devastating insights. Blatt told Miller that the hardest part of torture was the realisation that the torturer was also your brother. It is the same generosity that makes Max such a compelling argument against narrowness and division. Blatt’s life has deep and wide ramifications. Miller’s intelligent love has created a tale for the ages.' 

A Brief Affair, published by Allen & Unwin in 2022, is Alex Miller's most recent novel. .

Awards

 1990 Winner, the Braille Book of the Year Award for The Tivington Nott
 1993 Winner, the Miles Franklin Award for The Ancestor Game 
 1993 Winner, the Commonwealth Writers' Prize, Overall Best Book Award for The Ancestor Game
 1996 Shortlisted, the Miles Franklin award for The Sitters
 2001 Shortlisted, the Miles Franklin award for Conditions of Faith, 
 2001 Winner, the New South Wales Premier's Literary Awards Christina Stead Prize for Fiction for Conditions of Faith
 2003 Winner, the Miles Franklin Award for Journey to the Stone Country
 2005 Winner, State Library of Tasmania's People's Choice Award for  Journey to the Stone Country
 2005 Shortlisted, the Tasmania Pacific Fiction Prize for Journey to the Stone Country
 2006 Longlisted, the Miles Franklin award for Prochownik's Dream 
 2008 Shortlisted, the Miles Franklin award for Landscape of Farewell 
 2008 Winner, the Manning Clark House National Cultural Award for an outstanding contribution to the quality of Australian cultural life for Landscape of Farewell
 2008 Winner, the Weishanhu Award for Best Foreign Novel in the 21st Century from the People's Literature Publishing House in China for Landscape of Farewell
 2010 Shortlisted, the Miles Franklin award for Lovesong
 2010 Winner, The Age Book of the Year award for Lovesong
 2010 Winner, The Age Fiction Prize for Lovesong
 2010 Shortlisted, the Australian Prime Minister's Literary Award for Fiction for Lovesong 
 2011 Winner, the New South Wales Premier's Literary Awards Christina Stead Prize for Fiction for Lovesong
 2011 Winner, the New South Wales Premier's Literary Awards, People's Choice Award for Lovesong
 2012 Shortlisted, the Australian Prime Minister's Literary Award for Autumn Laing
 2012 Longlisted, the Miles Franklin award for Autumn Laing
 2012 Winner, the Melbourne Prize for Literature
 2014 Winner, the Victorian Premier's Literary Award for Coal Creek
 2021 Shortlisted, the National Biography Award for Max 

Miller is a recipient of the Centenary Medal, and in 2008 the Manning Clark Medal for "An outstanding contribution to Australian cultural life." Miller is a Fellow of the Australian Academy of the Humanities.

Bibliography

Novels
 Watching the Climbers on the Mountain (1988)
 The Tivington Nott (1989)
 The Ancestor Game (1992)
 The Sitters (1995)
 Conditions of Faith (2000)
 Journey to the Stone Country (2002)
 Prochownik's Dream (2005)
 Landscape of Farewell (2007)
 Lovesong (2009)
 Autumn Laing (2011)
 Coal Creek (2013)
 The Passage of Love (2017)
 A Brief Affair (2022)

Collections
 The Simplest Words (2015)

Non-Fiction
  Max (2020)

Major short essays and short stories
'Comrade Pawel', 1975, Meanjin Quarterly, No 1, Vol 34.
'How to Kill Wild Horses', 1976, Quadrant, No 103, Vol XX, No 2.
'The Wine Merchant of Aarhus', 1993, Kunapipi, Vol XV, No 3.
'Inside Buckingham Palace', 1994, Brick, No 48.
'Impressions of China', 1996, Meridian, Vol 15, No 1.
'The Last Sister of Charity', 2000, The Age, 18 Nov.
'Chasing My Tale, 2003, Kunapipi, Vol XV, No 3.
'The Black Mirror', 2006, Art & Australia, Vol 43, No 3.
'Written in Our Hearts, 2006, Thinking about Truth in Fiction and History', The Australian, 16–17 Dec.
'Caught Behind My Imagination', 2006, The Age, Summer Age, Friday 29 Dec.
'Salem Lodge,' 2008, Meanjin Quarterly, Vol 67, No 3.
'The Artist to Himself', 2008, Rick Amor: A Single Mind, Heide Museum of Modern Art, Australia.
'John Masefield's Attic', 2009, Closing Address to The Flight of the Mind, Conference National Library of Australia, 25 Oct.
'The End', 2009, Cotter, J and Williams M, (Eds), Readings and Writings, Forty Years in Books, Readings, Australia.
'The Circle of His Art', 2011, Skovron, A, Gaita, R, and Miller, A, Singing for All He's Worth, Essays in Honour of Jacob G Rosenberg, Picador, Australia.
'Ringroad', Sonya Hartnett, Ed, 2012, The Best Australian Short Stories, Black Inc.
'Asylum: A Secure Place of Refuge', 2013, Rosie Scott and Tom Keneally, Eds, A Country Too Far, Viking, Australia.
'The Rule of The First Prelude', 2015, Alex Miller, The Simplest Words, Allen & Unwin, Australia.
'The Compound', 2019, Griffith Review, No 67.

Drama
 Kitty Howard (1978), Melbourne Theatre Company
 Exiles (1981), Anthill Theatre

Reviews
 Morag Fraser, 2011, 'A Space of Its Own Creation, Alex Miller's Indispensable New Novel', "Australian Book Review", accessed 1 July 2013.
 Jem Poster, 2010, 'Lovesong by Alex Miller', "The Guardian", accessed 1 July 2013.
 Perry Middlemiss, 2010, 'Combined Reviews: Lovesong by Alex Miller, "Matilda" , accessed 1 July 2013.

 Geordie Williamson, 'Lovesong', 2009, The Monthly, accessed November 2012.
 Reviews of Alex Miller's novels,  accessed 1 July 2013.
 Geordie Williamson, 'Alex Miller's 'Coal Creek', September 2003, "The Monthly", accessed November 2013.
 Brian Matthews, 'Hanging on the Cross, Alex Miller's Journey of the Imagination', October 2013, "Australian Book Review", accessed November 2013.
 Anthony Lynch, "Real Men Roll Their Own", "Coal Creek" by Alex Miller, 14 March 2014, Sydney Review of Books, accessed 11 August 2014.
 Dimitri Nasrullah, 'Coal Creek by Alex Miller: review', 17 July 2014, "The Toronto Star", accessed 11 August 2014.
 Brenda Walker, 'Brenda Walker Reviews 'The Simplest Words', March 2016, no 379, "Australian Book Review", accessed 30 December 2016.
 The Simplest Words: A Storyteller’s Journey is perhaps a frame for each of these parts of Alex Miller — the artist and thinker — to meet and wander beside one another in contemplative conversation. Niki Tulk, 'Between Two Dreamings', Antipodes, Aug 16, 2019. 
 Kirkus Reviews, 'A rich addition to the growing shelf of autofiction from a seasoned storyteller', June 18, 2018. 
 Bridget Delaney, 'Alex Miller evokes lost Melbourne and past loves in 'private and personal' novel', The Guardian, 13 Dec 2017.

Interviews
 Jonathan Pearlman, 'Australia's treatment of refugees is 'cruel and mean-spirited', The Telegraph, 26 December 2013,, accessed January 2014.
 Oliver Milman, 'Novelist Alex Miller attacks Australia's 'cruel and inhumane' refugee treatment', The Guardian, 27 December 2013, accessed January 2014.
 Jane Sullivan, 'Interview: Alex Miller', The Sydney Morning Herald, 5 October 2013, accessed January 2014.
 Michael Cathcart, ABC Radio,'Alex Miller on 'The Passage of Love', 14 November 2017,
 Jason Steger, 'I can't keep going forever: Has Alex Miller given us his last story?', The Sydney Morning Herald, 16 October 2020,

Critical works on Alex Miller
 Robert Dixon, Ed, 2012, The Novels of Alex Miller, An Introduction, Allen & Unwin, Sydney. 
 Robert Dixon, 2014, Alex Miller: the ruin of time, Sydney University Press, Sydney.  
 Nicholas Birns, 2015, 'Failing to Be Separate: Race, Land, Concern', in Contemporary Australian Literature, Sydney Studies in Australian Literature, Sydney University Press, pp 121–155. 
 Joseph Cummins, 2019, 'Sound and Silence: Listening and Relation in the Novels of Alex Miller', in The 'Imagined Sound' of Australian Literature and Music, Anthem Press, London, pp 65–82.

References

External links
 
 Alex Miller, AustLit, http://www.austlit.edu.au/austlit/page/A12971.  Accessed June 2013
 Information and critical comment: Alex Miller, http://alexmiller.com.au/default.html.  Accessed November 2012.
 Author profile page at Allen & Unwin: Allen & Unwin  https://www.allenandunwin.com/authors/m/alex-miller.  Accessed September 2015.
 Alex Miller's Facebook Page: https://www.facebook.com/pages/Alex-Miller/564855286903403?ref=hl   Accessed August 2014.

1936 births
Living people
Australian dramatists and playwrights
Miles Franklin Award winners
Writers from Melbourne
University of Melbourne alumni
20th-century Australian novelists
21st-century Australian novelists
Australian male novelists
English emigrants to Australia